Podhradie is a municipalityin the Topoľčany District of the Nitra Region, Slovakia. In 2011 it had 304 inhabitants.

Podhradie lies on the upper Slivnica stream. The center of the village sits at 435 meters above sea level, while the village territory varies from 223 to 863 meters above sea level. Podhradie occupies the site of the early settlement Hornouc, of Hrnovce, thought to have been destroyed by brigands. Iron Age fortifications existed within the current village territory. Traces of prehistoric dwellers can also be found. At one point gold was mined, coins minted and iron ore smelted. In the mid-13th century a castle keep was built and became the seat of the Topoľčany estate, which contained 26 villages. In 1390 the village appeared in records as Waralya, and in 1580 as Podhragy. Throughout the Middle Ages Podhradie had the largest population in the area. In the 15th century Hussite troops occupied Topoľčany. In the 18th century the seat of the Topoľčany domain moved to Tovarníky. When the Stummer family assumed power of Topoľčany at the end of the 19th century, it began to restore and preserve the castle ruin, which had suffered damages under repeated raids by Turks. 3 water mills were in operation until the 1930s, and under capitalism a lime kiln was in operation, as well a quarry, vineyards and a charcoal burner. In 1787 the village had 595 residents, in 1828 363, and in 1960 606. A sky slope is located behind the castle, and there is a cave next to it. The village territory includes two nature preserves.

References

External links
http://www.en.e-obce.sk/obec/podhradie-topolcany/podhradie.html
Official homepage

Villages and municipalities in Topoľčany District